Richard Mohr (June 13, 1919 in Springfield, Ohio – November 23, 2002 in West Milford, New Jersey) was one of RCA Victor’s most prominent producers of classical and operatic music recordings from 1943 through 1977. His producing credits included  recording the casts of the world premieres of Samuel Barber's Vanessa and Gian Carlo Menotti's Amahl and the Night Visitors, as well as the first LP recordings of Ernani, Luisa Miller and Lucrezia Borgia and three versions each of Rigoletto, Aida, La Traviata and Il Trovatore. 

His orchestral repertory began with the last of the live, historical performances of Arturo Toscanini and the NBC Symphony Orchestra and continued over the years with such conductors as Leopold Stokowski, Pierre Monteux, Charles Munch, Fritz Reiner, Arthur Fiedler, Erich Leinsdorf, Tullio Serafin, Jean Morel, Zubin Mehta, James Levine, Georg Solti, Fausto Cleva and Nello Santi, conducting some of the world's most prestigious orchestras, such as The Chicago Symphony Orchestra, The Boston Symphony Orchestra, The Philadelphia Orchestra, The London Philharmonic Orchestra, the New Philharmonia Orchestra, and the London Symphony Orchestra.

The recorded legacy he left behind contains more than 80 complete opera recordings, including the landmark, La Bohème with Victoria de los Angeles and Jussi Bjoerling, conducted by Thomas Beecham. Other operas featured many of the glorious voices of the era including  Leontyne Price, Montserrat Caballé, Martina Arroyo, Fiorenza Cossotto, Ruggero Raimondi, Leonard Warren, Licia Albanese, Robert Merrill, Roberta Peters, Zinka Milanov, Jan Peerce, Richard Tucker, Renata Scotto, Renata Tebaldi, Plácido Domingo, Sherrill Milnes, Gabriel Bacquier, Nicolai Gedda, Giuseppe di Stefano, Anna Moffo and Mirella Freni. 

Martin Bernheimer, former music critic of  the Los Angeles Times said of him that  "He had a great eye and ear for talent and for putting important people together for projects that had lasting value to the music lover. He was an enabler with great imagination and great taste. My impression was he got (the artists) to behave like pussy-cats."
His body of work earned him five Grammy Awards for Best Opera Recording of the year and at least twenty-five  Grammy nominations. He is also widely known for his appearances on the Met Opera Quiz broadcasts as a panelist and later as producer of the Metropolitan Opera radio broadcast intermission features.

References

External links
Biography and detailed account

1919 births
2002 deaths
Record producers from Ohio
People from Springfield, Ohio
People from West Milford, New Jersey